Gimpo International Airport  (sometimes referred to as Seoul–Gimpo International Airport), formerly rendered in English as Kimpo International Airport, is located in the far western end of Seoul, some  west of the Central District of Seoul. Gimpo was the main international airport for Seoul and South Korea before being replaced by Incheon International Airport in 2001. It now functions as Seoul's secondary airport. In 2015, over 23 million passengers used the airport, making it the third-largest airport in Korea, as it has been surpassed by Jeju International Airport.

The airport is located south of the Han River in western Seoul. The name "Gimpo" comes from the nearby city of Gimpo, of which the airport used to be a part.

On 29 November 2003, scheduled services between Gimpo and Haneda Airport in Tokyo resumed with services to resume at Incheon Airport. Services to Shanghai Hongqiao International Airport resumed on 28 October 2007. Services to Kansai International Airport in Osaka, Japan, started on 26 October 2008 with services also operating at Incheon Airport. Services to Beijing Capital International Airport started on 1 July 2011 with services also operating at Incheon Airport. Services to Taipei Songshan Airport started on 30 April 2012.

History 
The airfield was built in 1939 during the Japanese Imperial period as an Imperial Army base. The runways were built on a bed of rocks manually hauled by Korean laborers from Kaihwasan and Yangchan, several miles from the base. Then known as Keijo New Airfield (京城新飛行場), Kimpo was constructed with four runways to supplement the much smaller Keijo Airfield (京城飛行場), which was later known as Yeouido Airport.

Korean War
Gimpo played a major role during the Korean War, and the USAF designated the airfield as Kimpo Air Base or K-14.

North Korean forces attacked South Korea on 25 June 1950 starting the Korean War. During one of the first Korean People's Air Force (KPAF) attacks on 25 June, a Military Air Transport Service C-54 Skymaster was destroyed on the ground at Gimpo. On 27 June, US naval and air forces began evacuating 748 US diplomats, military dependents, and civilians by air transport from Kimpo and Suwon Airfield. On the afternoon of 27 June, five F-82 Twin Mustangs of the 68th Fighter Squadron and 339th Fighter Squadron were escorting four C-54 Skymaster aircraft out of Kimpo when the C-54s were attacked by five KPAF Lavochkin La-7 fighters. In the subsequent dogfights, three LA-7s were shot down for the loss of no US aircraft in the first air battle of the war.
Later that day, four F-80Cs of the 35th Fighter-Bomber Squadron shot down four Ilyushin Il-10s for no losses over Gimpo in the USAF's first jet-aircraft victory.

Gimpo was captured by the KPA shortly after the capture of Seoul on 28 June 1950. On 29 June, eight B-29s of the 19th Bomb Group bombed Gimpo and the Seoul railyards. By July, the KPAF were using the base for attacks on UN forces; on 10 July, seven Yak-7s were hidden at Gimpo and used in strikes against UN positions at Cheongju. The next day, they surprised and damaged several Lockheed F-80s in the area. On 15 July, the US launched an attack on Gimpo, destroying two or three of the seven Yak-7s there and damaging the runway. On 5 August 5th Air Force fighters strafed and bombed Gimpo, destroying 9 aircraft and damaging 9 others.

Following the Inchon landings on 15 September 1950, the 2nd Battalion 5th Marines was ordered to seize Gimpo on 17 September. Gimpo was defended by a conglomeration of half-trained fighting men and service forces, and by the morning of 18 September, the Marines had secured the airfield. The airfield was in excellent shape as the North Koreans had not had time to do any major demolition. On 19 September, the U.S. Army Corps of Engineers repaired the local railroad up to 8 miles (13 km) inland and 32 C-54 transport planes began flying in gasoline and ordnance. VMF-212 was one of the first units to operate from Gimpo before moving forward to Yonpo Airfield. On 25 September, the 811th Engineer Aviation Battalion began repairing bomb damage on the  asphalt runway at Gimpo and covering it with Marston matting. On 6 October, the USAF took control of Gimpo from the USMC.

Following the Chinese Third Phase Campaign and the defeat of UN Forces at the 38th parallel, on 5 January 1951, General Ridgway ordered the evacuation of Seoul and the withdrawal of UN forces to a new defensive line along the 37th parallel. Units based at Gimpo were withdrawn to the south and facilities were destroyed to prevent their use by Chinese and North Korean forces.

UN forces resumed the offensive again in late January 1951 and launched Operation Thunderbolt on 25 January, with the aim of pushing Chinese and North Korean forces back north of the Han River. By 10 February 1951, UN forces once again had control of Gimpo.

USAF units based at Gimpo (Kimpo) included:
4th Fighter Wing operating F-86s from 23 August 1951 to 1 October 1954, subordinate units included:
334th Fighter-Interceptor Squadron
335th Fighter-Interceptor Squadron
336th Fighter-Interceptor Squadron
8th Fighter-Bomber Wing from 25 June to 23 August 1951
51st Fighter-Interceptor Wing from 10 October 1950 to 10 December 1950, subordinate units included:
16th Fighter-Interceptor Squadron operating F-80s from 22 October 1950 to 3 January 1951
25th Fighter-Interceptor Squadron operating F-80s from October 1950 to November 1951
67th Tactical Reconnaissance Group from 20 August 1951 to 6 December 1954, subordinate units included:
12th Tactical Reconnaissance Squadron operating RB-26Bs
15th Tactical Reconnaissance Squadron operating RF-80s and RF-86s
45th Tactical Reconnaissance Squadron operating F-51s
68th Fighter Squadron operating F-82s from 30 November 1950 to March 1951 and from 27 June to 24 August 1951
80th Fighter Squadron operating P-51s from 27 October to 20 December 1950

Other UN units based at Gimpo (Kimpo) included:
No. 77 Squadron RAAF operating Gloster Meteors from June 1951

On 21 September 1953, North Korean pilot No Kum-Sok defected in his MiG-15, landing at Gimpo.

International era 

In 1958, the airport was redesignated as the Gimpo international airport of Seoul by a presidential decree, completely replacing the existing Yeouido Airport.

Following the construction of Gimpo, Yeouido Airport was demolished. Gimpo soon became the main airport of Seoul, and of South Korea in general. In 1971, a new, combined domestic and international terminal was opened. However, following the opening of what was known as Terminal 1 in 1977, the original combined terminal was converted to domestic flights only. Later, Terminal 2 was opened due to the Olympic Games.

Gradually, Gimpo began to have more flights than it was capable of handling. After about 1980, it experienced numerous problems due to its lack of space for expansion. An additional problem was South Korea's overnight curfew (midnight to 4 am), a security measure that was in effect for decades. The curfew, which severely limited the airport's night operations, was finally abolished in 1982.

Eventually, the South Korean government decided to build a new airport. The facility was initially planned to be in Cheongju, 124 km away from Seoul, but that idea was strongly opposed by the citizens of Seoul and Gyeonggi Province, due to the inconvenience it would pose to them. (It would have been farther from Seoul than the 80-km distance between Viracopos Airport in Campinas, Brazil, and the city of São Paulo.) Finally, Yeongjong Island, a part of the city of Incheon, slightly west of Seoul, was chosen for the new airport, which later came to be known as Incheon International Airport. All international flights were moved to Incheon when it opened in 2001.

Post-Incheon-activation era 
"Shuttle" flights to Haneda Airport in Tokyo started in November 2003 on a charter basis, cutting 30 minutes or more of ground transportation at each end in an attempt to attract business travelers. This "city to city" route was followed by new routes to Hongqiao Airport in Shanghai starting in October 2007, Kansai Airport in Osaka starting in 2008, Beijing starting in July 2011, and Songshan Airport in Taipei starting in April 2012. Total international passenger numbers at Gimpo rose from under one million in 2005 to over four million by 2012. Most services to Osaka and Beijing also operate from Incheon Airport. 

The Haneda-Gimpo route was suspended in 2020 due to the COVID-19 pandemic, but resumed in June 2022 with eight weekly roundtrips, and recovered to 84 weekly roundtrips by the end of 2022 as entry restrictions were lifted. However, Incheon-Haneda route will resume on 26 March 2023 with services operating at both airports. 

Korea Airports announced an expansion and remodeling of the terminals in 2013, adding new gates and security checkpoints. In 2017, the South Korean government announced that a new terminal would be built to meet growing domestic traffic.

Gimpo currently has two runways (3600 × 45 m and 3200 × 60 m), two passenger terminals, and one cargo terminal.

Airlines and destinations

Statistics

Top carriers 

In 2016, the ten carriers with the largest percentage of passengers flying into, out of, or through Gimpo International Airport are as follows:

Traffic by calendar year

Other facilities 
Korea Airports Corporation (KAC) has its headquarters on the airport property.

The Aviation and Railway Accident Investigation Board (ARAIB) has its FDR/CVR Analysis and Wreckage Laboratory on the property of the airport. When the predecessor agency Korea Aviation Accident Investigation Board (KAIB) existed, its CVR/FDR and wreckage laboratory was located on the airport property.

Ground transportation

Railway
On 23 March 2007 the AREX airport express line started operations to Incheon International Airport, with an extension to Seoul Station which opened in December 2010. Seoul Subway Line 9 also links the airport to the Gangnam area.

For many years, the airport was served by the Gimpo Line, a railway line that no longer exists. In the 1990s, Seoul Subway Line 5 was extended to Gimpo Airport.

Roadway
Gimpo International Airport is connected to Incheon International Airport by Incheon International Airport Expressway via Gimpo Airport Interchange.

Some others road also linked Gimpo Airport with Seoul and nearby province including National Route 39, National Route 48, Olympic-daero and Seoul City Route 92 (Nambu Beltway).

Accidents and incidents
 On 19 November 1980, Korean Air Lines Flight 015, a Boeing 747-200 landed short of the runway, ripping off all main landing gear, causing the aircraft to skid to a stop on the nose wheel and outer 2 engines starting a fire. 15 of the 226 total occupants were killed, including the First Officer and Captain.
 On 14 September 1986, A bomb blast occurred outside a terminal building, killing five people and wounding 36. The attack was blamed on North Korea as an attempt to disrupt the 1986 Asian Games starting 6 days later.
 On 25 November 1989, Korean Air Flight 175, a Fokker F28-4000 en route to Gangneung Airport stalled and crashed right after takeoff, killing one person and wounding 40 people.
 On 5 August 1998, Korean Air Flight 8702, a Boeing 747-400 rolled off the runway upon touchdown and slid into a ditch, resulting in the destruction of the aircraft's undercarriage and the fuselage being split. All 395 of the total occupants survived and the aircraft was written off.

See also 

 List of the busiest airports in South Korea
Transport in South Korea

References

External links 

 Gimpo Airport

 
Airports established in 1939
1939 establishments in Korea
Airports in South Korea
Transport in Seoul
Buildings and structures in Gangseo District, Seoul
Korean War air bases
Installations of the United States Air Force in South Korea
20th-century architecture in South Korea